The Ramsar Convention on wetland protection was signed in Ramsar, Iran in 1971.

Ramsar Convention wetland sites
The following is a list of sites protected under this treaty:

See also
 Ramsar Convention
 List of Ramsar sites worldwide
Forestry in Pakistan

References

Further reading
Wetlands of Pakistan at pakistanpaedia.com

External links
pakistanwetlands.org
wwfpak.org
pakwetnet.com



Wetlands
Pakistan
Ramsar